Asperges me is a Latin antiphon said or sung at a Roman Catholic High Mass in all seasons except the Easter (Paschal) season and Palm Sunday. It traditionally accompanies the Asperges, the ritual sprinkling of the congregation by the celebrant with holy water, as part of an entrance ritual, symbolising the cleansing of the people. Its words are taken from Psalm 51 (50):

It is followed by the conventional doxology (except on the first Sunday of Passiontide):

The antiphon is then recited a second time.

From Easter until Pentecost, Asperges me is replaced by the more lengthy and florid antiphon, Vidi aquam.

Although usually sung to plainchant, Asperges Me has been set to music; two well-known examples are those by Gilles Binchois (Bologna, International museum and library of music, Ms Q15) and Tomás Luis de Victoria.

References

External links 
 PDF score of Victoria's setting

Mass in the Catholic Church
Christian liturgical music
Latin religious words and phrases
Order of Mass

nl:Asperges me